Rudnyanskoye Urban Settlement is the name of several municipal formations in Russia.

Rudnyanskoye Urban Settlement, an administrative division and a municipal formation which the town of Rudnya in Rudnyansky District of Smolensk Oblast is incorporated as
Rudnyanskoye Urban Settlement, a municipal formation which the Urban-Type Settlement of Rudnya in Rudnyansky District of Volgograd Oblast is incorporated as

See also
Rudnyansky (disambiguation)

References

Notes

Sources

